The 2019 African Rally Championship was the 39th season of the African Rally Championship (ARC), the FIA regional zone rally championship for the African continent. The season began on February 21 in the Côte d'Ivoire, and ended on October 10 in Rwanda, after seven events.

Skoda Fabia driver Manvir Singh Baryan won his third consecutive title. Baryan again won three of the seven rallies, taking victory in the Rallye Côte d'Ivoire, Zambia International Rally and Pearl of Africa Uganda Rally. Baryan dominated the title, winning with 201 points compared to Zambian Ford driver Leeroy Gomes 88 points. Baryan's title extended the run of Kenyan success to five consecutive years.

Kenyan Mitsubishi driver and winner of the Safari Rally, Baldev Chager was third in the championship on 56 points, six points ahead of South African Toyota driver Hergen Fekken. Fekken won the Rally of South Africa. Baryan wrapped up the title early in August after winning the Pearl of Africa Uganda Rally. The two subsequent rallies in Tanzania and Rwanda were won by local drivers who were not chasing the African title.

Event calendar and results
There were seven rallies in the 2019 African Rally Championship. The only change from the 2018 schedule was the Safari Rally that moved from March to July:

Championship standings
The 2019 African Rally Championship points are as follows:

References

External links

African Rally Championship
African
Rally Championship